Milan Pastva (born 1 July 1980 in Čadca) is a Slovak football midfielder who currently plays for the Majstrovstvá regiónu club FC Baník Horná Nitra.

Honours

FBK Kaunas
A Lyga (2): 2003, 2004

References

External links

1980 births
Living people
Slovak footballers
Association football midfielders
MŠK Rimavská Sobota players
AS Trenčín players
FC Baník Prievidza players
Slovak Super Liga players
FBK Kaunas footballers
FK Šilutė players
Expatriate footballers in Lithuania
FC Tatabánya players
Budapest Honvéd FC players
Expatriate footballers in Hungary
People from Čadca
Sportspeople from the Žilina Region